Saad Zagulul Faruk (27 February 2003) is a Jatiya Party (Ershad) politician and the former Member of Parliament of Bhola-4.

His father was late Shamsul Ulama Mawlana Nasir Ahmed Khan (died in 1951), a graduate from Aligarh Muslim University in India, Double gold Medalists, While studying, he played an active role in the anti British movement, he was the superintendent of the Alia Madrasa (now Alyah University) in Calcutta and was an working member of the Bengal  Congress in Calcutta under Mahatma Gandhi regime and rebellion against the anti-British movement (1905). Later in 1925 he served in Bhola Islamia Madrasa presently known as Bhola Darul Hadis Kamil-Masters Madrasa (established in 1913). in  last decade of 17th century Faruk's grand father came from Persia tfor business trade and spread education in India, later he settled in Southern part of Shabazpur a remote village of Hizla-Muladi of Barisal under Mughals.  Zagulul's father moved to Charfassion with his family from South Shahbazpur in British regime.

Career
Faruk was elected to parliament from Bhola-4 as a Jatiya Party candidate in 1986 and 1988.

He was a well-known personality and the founding principal of Savar University College, In August 1977, he represented Bangladesh at the World Teachers' Conference in Lagos, then the capital of Nigeria.

Death 
Saad Zagulul Faruk died on 27 February 2003.

References

Jatiya Party politicians
2003 deaths
3rd Jatiya Sangsad members
4th Jatiya Sangsad members
People from Bhola District